Paul Bentley (born 18 January 1968) is a former speedway rider from England.

Speedway career 
Bentley rode in the top two tiers of British Speedway from 1987 to 2005, riding for various clubs. In 1994, he won the British League Division Two Riders Championship.

References 

Living people
1968 births
British speedway riders
Berwick Bandits riders
Bradford Dukes riders
Coventry Bees riders
Glasgow Tigers riders
Hull Vikings riders
Middlesbrough Bears riders
Newcastle Diamonds riders